Sik District is a district in Kedah, Malaysia. It is largest district in Kedah.

Etymology
The name of the district was derived from the Arab word "Syed" or "Sheikh" (pronounced as such in Pattani Malay as "Sik" and "Saik"), after the Arab missionaries who spread Islam into the region.

Administrative divisions

Sik District is divided into 3 mukims, which are:
 Jeneri
 Sik (capian)
 Sok
Including 5 towns:
 Sik Town
 Pekan Batu Lima Sik
 Pekan Gulau
 Pekan Gajah Puteh
 Pekan Charok Padang

Demographics

Federal Parliament and State Assembly Seats 

List of Sik district representatives in the Federal Parliament (Dewan Rakyat) 

List of Sik district representatives in the State Legislative Assembly (Dewan Undangan Negeri)

Government
Sik District is administered by Sik District Council.

Attractions
Sik is famous for the Muda River, which is the longest river in Kedah and the Beris Dam, which is a water supply dam completed in 2004 at a cost of RM360 million. A popular attraction nearby is Beris Vineyard which has attracted thousands of visitors since its opening.

One village (kampung) in Mukim Teloi near the Thai border, Kampung Tupai, is notable for its many squirrels, hence the name of the village.

See also
 Districts of Malaysia
 Kampung Jering

References